55th–56th–57th Street is a commuter rail station in Hyde Park, Chicago that serves the Metra Electric Line north to Millennium Station and south to University Park, Blue Island, and South Chicago; and the South Shore Line to Gary and South Bend, Indiana. The South Shore Line calls the station 57th Street. It is the closest station to the Museum of Science and Industry, and also serves the residential neighborhood adjoining the University of Chicago. As of 2018, the station is the 39th busiest of Metra's 236 non-downtown stations, with an average of 1,133 weekday boardings.

The South Shore Line began stopping at 57th Street on October 16, 1966, at noon. Prior to this, the South Shore Line had stopped at 53rd Street. The switch was made to better serve the University of Chicago and the Museum of Science and Industry.

This station, and the adjacent 53rd Street station, were rebuilt in 2002 with concrete platforms to replace wooden platforms built in the 1920s.

Until November 2014 (when the staffed station closed), this was the only station along the route outside of Downtown Chicago's two main stations that had a staffed ticket office, as many express trains on both lines stop at the station and it is the South Side's main station.

Bus connections
CTA
  15 Jeffery Local 
  28 Stony Island 
  55 Garfield (Owl Service) 
  171 University of Chicago/Hyde Park

References

External links 
 

 South Shore Line - Stations

Former Illinois Central Railroad stations
Metra stations in Chicago
South Shore Line stations in Illinois
Railway stations in Illinois at university and college campuses
Railway stations in Chicago